B. arborea may refer to:
 Banksia arborea, the Yilgarn dryandra, a plant species endemic to Western Australia
 Brugmansia arborea, the angel's trumpet, a flowering plant species found in Bolivia, Colombia and Peru
 Bulnesia arborea, a flowering plant species is native to Colombia and Venezuela

See also 
 Arborea (disambiguation)